The Bundaberg Spirit Football Club were an Australian soccer club located in Bundaberg, Queensland who competed in the Queensland State League. They participated in this competition since its inaugural season in 2008. Each season Bundaberg had finished in bottom place on the ladder and went through winless in the 2009 season. In 2012 the Bundaberg Spirit team was dissolved and removed from the Queensland State League due to poor finances and continued bad results. This served to strengthen the playing level and ability of the local soccer league in Bundaberg.

Last squad
2012 Queensland State League Squad

References

Association football clubs established in 2008
Queensland State League soccer teams
2008 establishments in Australia
Bundaberg
Association football clubs disestablished in 2012
2012 disestablishments in Australia